Kowguran is a rural locality in the Western Downs Region, Queensland, Australia.

The RAAF Area Explosives Reserve, Kowguran is located close by.

References 

Western Downs Region
Localities in Queensland